Beverly Goebel Yanez (born Beverly June Goebel; July 19, 1988) is an American soccer coach and former professional player who is currently the assistant coach of Racing Louisville FC and most recently at NJ/NY Gotham FC of the National Women's Soccer League (NWSL). As a player, Goebel Yanez played as a forward for Reign FC in the NWSL, Melbourne City in the Australian W-League, INAC Kobe Leonessa in the Japanese Nadeshiko.League, PK-35 in Finland's Naisten Liiga, as well as the Western New York Flash and the Washington Freedom in the WPS.

After switching from the midfielder position to forward in 2012, Goebel Yanez became the top scorer in Japan's Nadeshiko league in 2013 earning the Golden Boot award. She was a top-scorer for the Seattle Reign during the 2014 and 2015 seasons and has been named to Best XI teams in both top-division leagues. On February 10, 2020, Goebel Yanez announced her retirement from professional soccer.

Early life
Raised in Moreno Valley, California, Goebel Yanez attended Moreno Valley High School where she helped lead the women's soccer team win the Coast Soccer League and was named the League's MVP and offensive MVP. She played for club team Freedom United for two years helping team to 2004 Nike Harvest Cup and Coast Soccer League championships.

Sacramento State University, 2006
In 2006, Goebel Yanez attended Sacramento State University. As a freshman, she finished fourth on the team in scoring with two goals and six assists and received All-Big Sky Honorable Mention honors. Her six assists ranked second on the team and third in the Big Sky Conference. Yanez recorded a team-high of 66 shots and ranked third in the Big Sky Conference with 3.19 shots per game.

University of Miami, 2007–2009
Goebel Yanez transferred after her freshman year to the University of Miami for the remainder of her collegiate career. During her sophomore year, she played in all 21 matches, starting 20 and finished the season third in scoring with four goals and four assists. She served an assist in three straight matches against Alabama A&M University, Samford University and LSU. She ranked third on the team in both shots (38) and shots on goal (19). As a junior, she played in 13 matches, starting 12 and finished the season with three assists. As a senior, Goebel Yanez captained the team and finished her career at Miami having started 51 of 53 games.

Playing career

Club

WPS Years, 2010–2011 
Goebel Yanez was selected by the Washington Freedom in the third round of the 2010 WPS Draft. She started in nine of 16 games for the Freedom and scored her first professional goal in a match against the Chicago Red Stars. 

In November 2010, Goebel Yanez was drafted by the expansion team Western New York Flash in the second round (27th overall) of the 2010 WPS Expansion Draft. She started three times in 14 total games during the 2011 WPS season, scoring one goal and providing one assist. The Flash won the 2011 WPS Championship after defeating the Philadelphia Independence in penalty kicks.

Pallokerho-35, 2011 
In 2011, Goebel Yanez signed with Finnish team, Pallokerho-35. She started in all six games in which she played for a total of 540 minutes and tallied one goal. The team won the Finnish Women's Cup after a 2–0 win over Ilves.

In early January 2012, Goebel Yanez signed with Sky Blue FC; however, later that month the WPS suspended operations before the season began.

INAC Kobe Leonessa, 2012–2014 
In April 2012, Goebel Yanez joined INAC Kobe Leonessa in Japan's Nadeshiko League who had seen her while on tour in Japan with Sky Blue FC in late 2011. During her first season with the team, Goebel Yanez played as a center-forward and scored 13 goals including two goals at the 2012 International Women's Club Championship where INAC finished second. INAC won the league championship and the Empress's Cup the same year.

As the league's top scorer in 2013, Goebel Yanez earned the league's Golden Boot award and was named to the Best XI after helping the team win the league championship for the second consecutive season. Yanez became the first foreign top scorer in the league since the 1990s. In December 2013, she helped the team win the Mobcast Cup, the unofficial women's club world championship tournament, after scoring a penalty kick to help INAC defeat Chelsea LFC 4–2. Her two goals at the tournament tied with Francisca Lara, Emi Nakajima, and Renee Rollason as the top scorer at the tournament.

Reign FC, 2014–2019 

In December 2013, Goebel Yanez signed with Seattle Reign FC for the second season of the National Women's Soccer League on loan from INAC Kobe Leonessa. Of the signing, Reign FC head coach, Laura Harvey said, "We immediately knew that Bev would be a massive addition to our club, so we made it a priority to find a way to bring her to Seattle for the 2014 season."

During the 2014 season, Goebel Yanez helped the Reign set a league record unbeaten streak of 16 games during the first part of the season. During the 16 game stretch, the team compiled a 13–0–3 record. The Reign finished first in the regular season clinching the NWSL Shield for the first time. After defeating the Washington Spirit 2–1 in the playoff semi-finals, the Reign were defeated 2–1 by FC Kansas City during the championship final. Yanez was the only Reign player to appear in all 24 regular season games and both playoff games, scoring 5 goals along the way.

After returning to INAC and playing for the rest of the 2014 Nadeshiko League season, Yanez signed for the Reign permanently ahead of the 2015 season. That year, Yanez was the second-highest scorer on the team with 9 goals following Kim Little with 10. The Reign finished the regular season in first place clinching the NWSL Shield for the second consecutive time. After advancing to the playoffs, Seattle faced fourth-place team Washington Spirit. Yanez scored the game-opening goal in the 71st minute after subbing in following a hip strain injury that had kept her from the pitch for a few games. After defeating the Spirit 3–0, the Reign advanced to the championship final. Seattle was ultimately defeated 1–0 by FC Kansas City during the championship final in Portland. Yanez, along with teammates Lauren Barnes, Kim Little, and Jess Fishlock were named to the NWSL Best XI team.

On February 10, 2020, Yanez announced her retirement from professional soccer.

Melbourne City 
On November 14, 2016, Reign FC announced that Yanez would be loaned to Australian club Melbourne City for the NWSL off-season.

Coaching career
Yanez served as an assistant coach for NJ/NY Gotham FC from 2021 to 2022. In November 2022, Racing Louisville FC named her as an assistant coach for the 2023 NWSL season.

Personal life
Yanez is married to former Columbus Crew midfielder Othaniel Yáñez.  On December 5, 2020, Yanez gave birth to their daughter.

Career statistics

Club

Honors

Club
Pallokerho-35
 Finnish Women's Cup: 2011

Western New York Flash
 WPS Championship: 2011
 WPSL-Elite Championship: 2012

INAC Kobe Leonessa
Nadeshiko.League (2): 2012, 2013
Empress's Cup All-Japan Women's Football Tournament (2): 2012, 2013
Nadeshiko.League Cup (1): 2013
International Women's Club Championship(1): 2013

Reign FC
 NWSL Shield (regular season winners): 2014, 2015
 NWSL Championship Runners Up: 2014, 2015

Individual
Nadeshiko.League Top Scorers (1): 2013
Nadeshiko.League Best Eleven (1): 2013
International Women's Club Championship Top Scorer (2): 2012, 2013

See also
 List of University of Miami alumni
 List of Seattle Reign FC players

References

Further reading
 Grainey, Timothy (2012), Beyond Bend It Like Beckham: The Global Phenomenon of Women's Soccer, University of Nebraska Press, 
 Stewart, Barbara (2012), Women's Soccer: The Passionate Game, D&M Publishers Incorporated,

External links

 
 
 University of Miami player profile 
 

1988 births
Living people
American women's soccer players
American women's soccer coaches
Female association football managers
Miami Hurricanes women's soccer players
Western New York Flash players
Washington Freedom players
Women's Professional Soccer players
INAC Kobe Leonessa players
National Women's Soccer League players
OL Reign players
Melbourne City FC (A-League Women) players
Nadeshiko League players
PK-35 Vantaa (women) players
Kansallinen Liiga players
Expatriate women's footballers in Finland
Expatriate women's footballers in Japan
American expatriate sportspeople in Finland
American expatriate sportspeople in Japan
American expatriate women's soccer players
People from Moreno Valley, California
Women's association football midfielders
Women's association football forwards
Sacramento State Hornets women's soccer players
Soccer players from California
Sportspeople from Riverside County, California
American expatriate sportspeople in Australia
Expatriate women's soccer players in Australia
NJ/NY Gotham FC non-playing staff
Racing Louisville FC non-playing staff